Queimadas may refer to:

Queimadas, Bahia, a town in Bahia state, Brazil
Queimadas, Paraíba, a town in Paraíba state, Brazil
Queimadas, Cape Verde, a village on São Nicolau island, Cape Verde